Affori FN is a station on Line 3 of the Milan Metro, in Italy, which opened on March 26, 2011, twenty-one years after the opening of the original trunk of the line. It is one of the four stations on Line 3 opened to the public in 2011, forming the section between Dergano and Comasina.

This station is located on Via Alessandro Astesani, at the border of two northern districts of Milan, Affori and Comasina; and this is one of the two stations existing within Affori, the other being Affori Centro.  Affori FN allows riders to change to lines S2 and S4 of the Milan S Lines operated by Ferrovie Nord Milano.

The station is underground, built in a single tunnel with two tracks.

References

External links 

Line 3 (Milan Metro) stations
Railway stations opened in 2011
2011 establishments in Italy
Railway stations in Italy opened in the 21st century